Marco António Pereira Grilo (born 22 July 1993) is a Portuguese professional footballer who plays for Lusitânia as a defender.

Club career
He made his Taça da Liga debut for Vilafranquense on 28 July 2019 in a game against Casa Pia.

On 13 July 2021, he signed with Lusitânia.

References

External links

1993 births
Living people
People from Alpiarça
Portuguese footballers
Association football defenders
Liga Portugal 2 players
Campeonato de Portugal (league) players
G.D. Tourizense players
A.C. Alcanenense players
Eléctrico F.C. players
G.D. Vitória de Sernache players
Sertanense F.C. players
U.D. Vilafranquense players
Lusitânia F.C. players
Sportspeople from Santarém District